Carola Saavedra (born 1973) is a Chilean-born Brazilian writer.

Biography and career 
Saavedra was born in Santiago, but moved with her family to Brazil when she was three years old. She graduated in journalism  by Pontifícia Universidade Católica do Rio de Janeiro. She lived in Spain, France and Germany, where she got a master's degree in communication studies. She lives in Rio de Janeiro.

Saavedra was an invited author at Festa Literária Internacional de Paraty (Flip) in 2010. In September 2018, Carola Saavedra launched her novel Com armas sonolentas in Porto Alegre.

Works 
 Com armas sonolentas (novel, Companhia das Letras, 2018)
 O inventário das coisas ausentes (novel, Companhia das Letras, 2014)
 Paisagem com dromedário (novel, Companhia das Letras, 2010)
 Flores azuis (novel, Companhia das Letras, 2008) - Published in English by Penguin Random House as "Blue Flowers" (2020), translated by Daniel Hahn
 Toda terça (novel, Companhia das Letras, 2007)
 Do lado de fora (short stories, 7Letras, 2005)

Participation in anthologies 
 Granta Magazine's The Best of Young Brazilian Novelists anthology (2012)
 Geração Zero Zero (Língua Geral, 2011)
 Essa história está diferente – Dez contos para canções de Chico Buarque (Companhia das Letras, 2010)
 Escritores escritos (Editora Flâneur, 2010)
 Um homem célebre: Machado recriado (Publifolha, 2008)

Awards and nominations 
 Premio APCA for Best Novel, 2008, for Flores azuis
 Prêmio Rachel de Queiroz, Young Author category, 2010, for Paisagem com dromedário
Saavedra was a runner-up for São Paulo de Literatura and Jabuti prizes.

References

External links 
 Official blog (in Portuguese)
 Video interview to ed. Saraiva
 Interview to newspaper Estado de S. Paulo

1973 births
Living people
Brazilian women journalists
Brazilian women novelists
21st-century Brazilian novelists
Chilean emigrants to Brazil
Chilean women writers
Pontifical Catholic University of Rio de Janeiro alumni
Writers from Rio de Janeiro (city)
Writers from Santiago
21st-century Brazilian women writers